was a professional Japanese baseball player, coach, and manager. He was elected to the Japanese Baseball Hall of Fame in 2004.

References

External links

1935 births
2005 deaths
People from Nakama, Fukuoka
Baseball people from Fukuoka Prefecture
Japanese Baseball Hall of Fame inductees
Japanese baseball players
Nippon Professional Baseball infielders
Nishitetsu Lions players
Managers of baseball teams in Japan
Osaka Kintetsu Buffaloes managers
Orix BlueWave managers
Orix Buffaloes managers